The Fuchs Medal is a medal awarded by The British Antarctic Survey for "Outstanding devotion to the British Antarctic Survey's interests, beyond the call of normal duty, by men or women who are or were members of the Survey, or closely connected with its work."

Creation
The award was created in 1973 and is named after the polar explorer Sir Vivian Fuchs, who was the director of BAS from 1958 to 1973.

Recipients
Source: British Antarctic Survey Club

See also

 List of geography awards

References

External links
 Halley Bay 25th Anniversary Reunion - 1981
 Obituary: Ray Adie - Scientist and explorer who dedicated his life to Antarctica

Geography awards
Geography of Antarctica
Awards established in 1973